Following is a list of senators of Saône-et-Loire, people who have represented the department of Saône-et-Loire in the Senate of France.

Third Republic

Senators for Saône-et-Loire under the French Third Republic were:

 Charles Rolland en 1876)
 Philippe Pernette (1876–1878)
 Charles Guillemaut (1876–1886)
 Alfred Mathey (1879–1892)
 Charles Demole (1879–1908)
 Félix Martin (1887–1924)
 François Dulac (1892–1900)
 Gabriel Magnien (1898–1914)
 Lucien Guillemaut (1898–1917)
 Léon Gillot (1900–1907)
 Jean Richard (1908–1929)
 Ferdinand Sarrien (1909–1915)
 Claude Desgranges (1920–1921)
 Jean Bouveri (1920–1924)
 Paul Gerbe (1920–1925)
 Julien Simyan (1921–1926)
 Claude Petitjean (1924–1932)
 Georges Duprey (1924–1936)
 Émile Chopin (1925–1935)
 Jean Pelletier (1927–1940)
 Charles Borgeot (1929–1940)
 Philibert Cochard (1933–1937)
 Henry Turlier (1935–1940)
 Henri Maupoil (1936–1940)
 Marcel Desprès (1937–1940)

Fourth Republic

Senators for Saône-et-Loire under the French Fourth Republic were:

 François Mercier (1946–1948)
 Julien Satonnet (1946–1948)
 Jean-Marie Thomas (1946–1948)
 Joseph Renaud (1948–1951)
 Henri Maupoil (1948–1958)
 Henri Varlot (1948–1958)
 Jules Pinsard (1951–1959)
 Marcel Legros (1958–1959)
 Xavier Perrier-Michon (1958–1959)

Fifth Republic 
Senators for Saône-et-Loire under the French Fifth Republic:

 Roger Lagrange (1959–1967)
 Marcel Legros (1959–1971)
 Jules Pinsard (1959–1977)
 Marcel Mathy (1967–1982)
 Marcel Lucotte (1971–1995)
 France Lechenault (1977–1986)
 Bernard Desbrière (1982–1986)
 André Pourny (1986–2004)
 André Jarrot (1986–1995)
 René Beaumont (UMP) (2004–2014)
 Jean-Patrick Courtois (UMP) (2014–2015) Dismissed
 Jean-Paul Emorine (UMP) From 2014
 Jérôme Durain (Parti socialiste) From 2014
 Marie Mercier (Les Républicains), From June 2015, replacing Jean-Patrick Courtois, dismissed

References

Sources

 
Lists of members of the Senate (France) by department